This Time for Keeps is a 1942 comedy film directed by Charles Reisner and starring Ann Rutherford, Robert Sterling, and Guy Kibbee.

Plot
Lee White, left alone while his wife Kit is out of town, moves in with her parents just to have some company. Lee is persuaded by father-in-law Harry to quit is job as a car salesman and come into the real-estate business with him. His first assignment is to sell a piece of land to Arthur Freeman, a wealthy property investor.

Kit's little sister Harriet enters a contest in a movie theater hoping to win a cash prize, but instead wins 200 bars of the sponsor's soap. Kit, meantime, comes home to find her husband and father working together but quarreling over Harry's unwillingness to interfere with Lee's work.

An inspirational idea to scatter Harriet's soap on the property for sale, making Freeman fear a soap company's about to buy it, backfires when Harry talks the client out of it. A frustrated Lee is offered a job by Freeman and considers it, concerning his wife.

Lee joins the rest of the family at a costume ball, where both Harry and Freeman are dressed as clowns. He mixes them up and by accident gets Harry to understand his love for Kit and her loved ones. As they agree to work better together, Harriet wins first prize at the ball—another 100 bars of soap.

Cast

Reception
The film made $207,000 in the US and Canada and $120,000 elsewhere during its initial release, making MGM a loss of $57,000.

References

External links
This Time for Keeps at TCMDB

1942 films
1942 musical comedy films
American musical comedy films
Films directed by Charles Reisner
Films scored by Lennie Hayton
Metro-Goldwyn-Mayer films
1940s English-language films
1940s American films